Seo Yi-ra (born 31 October 1992) is a South Korean short track speed skater. He competed in the 2018 Winter Olympics.

Seo Yi-ra advanced past the first heat to the semifinals in the 1,500 speed skate event. He did not advance to the finals.

References

1992 births
Living people
Speed skaters from Seoul
South Korean male short track speed skaters
Olympic short track speed skaters of South Korea
Olympic bronze medalists for South Korea
Olympic medalists in short track speed skating
Short track speed skaters at the 2018 Winter Olympics
Medalists at the 2018 Winter Olympics
Asian Games medalists in short track speed skating
Asian Games gold medalists for South Korea
Asian Games silver medalists for South Korea
Short track speed skaters at the 2017 Asian Winter Games
Medalists at the 2017 Asian Winter Games
World Short Track Speed Skating Championships medalists
Universiade gold medalists for South Korea
Universiade silver medalists for South Korea
Universiade medalists in short track speed skating
Competitors at the 2015 Winter Universiade
21st-century South Korean people